Atethmia pinkeri is a moth of the family Noctuidae. It is found in Turkey.

References

Cuculliinae
Endemic fauna of Turkey
Moths described in 1970
Moths of Asia